Bellevalia paradoxa is a bulb forming plant in the genus Bellevalia of the family Asparagaceae, formerly classified in the genus Muscari, under which name it is commonly sold as Muscari paradoxum.

Description
Bulbs are globose-ovoid, 1.5–2 cm long and 1–3 cm wide. Leaves 2–3, linear, narrowed at the base, with pointed tips, 12–15 cm long. The inflorescence is racemose, the petals 10–15 over a 1–2 cm brush, dark purple, with a perianth 0.5-0.6 cm long and 0.2-0.3 cm wide, anthers 0.6–1 mm, yellow. Bellevalia paradoxa blooms in late April, blooming for up to 25 days. In contrast to plant in the genus Muscari the flowers are campanulate, not rounded.

Distribution  
Eastern and north-eastern Turkey and Georgia, in mountain pastures, fields, rocky areas, and wet meadows at altitudes of 500–3000 m above sea level.

Cultivation
It is widely cultivated as an ornamental garden plant of the grape hyacinth class. It is hardy to USDA Hardiness Zones 7–9. It is best grown in relatively dry soil, in a sunny location.

References

Scilloideae
Taxa named by Carl Anton von Meyer
Taxa named by Pierre Edmond Boissier